Jack Kitchin (1901–1983) was a British film editor and producer. Kitchin worked as editor on over thirty films, and as producer on a further five. He worked in Hollywood for much of his career before returning to Britain where he was employed by Ealing Studios. At Ealing he headed a special unit which made George Formby comedy films.

Selected filmography

Editor
 Captain Careless (1928)
 Tropic Madness (1928)
 Dog Justice (1928)
Law of Fear (1928)
Orphan of the Sage  (1928)
 Sporting Life (1929)
 A Swift Lover (1929)
 The Yellowback (1929)
 Double Lives (1929)
 The Vagabond Cub (1929)
 The Woman I Love (1929)
 The Pride of Pawnee (1929)
 The Three Brothers (1929)
 Framed (1930)
 Escape (1930)
 Birds of Prey (1930)
 The Lady Refuses (1931)
 Laugh and Get Rich (1931)
 Three Who Loved (1931)
 The Penguin Pool Murder (1932)
 Flying Down to Rio (1933)
 Little Women (1933)
 Melody Cruise (1933)
 Lorna Doone (1934)
 The Show Goes On (1937)

Producer
 Keep Fit (1937)
 It's in the Air (1938)
 Trouble Brewing (1939)
 Come on George! (1939)
 Mine Own Executioner (1947)

References

Bibliography
 Richards, Jeffrey. The Age of the Dream Palace: Cinema and Society in 1930s Britain. I.B. Tauris, 2010.

External links

1901 births
1983 deaths
British film editors
British film producers
People from Burton Joyce
British expatriates in the United States